Chicheboville is a former commune in the Calvados department in the Normandy region in northwestern France. On 1 January 2017, it was merged into the new commune Moult-Chicheboville.

Population

In 1835 the former commune of Béneauville became part of Chicheboville.

Geography

See also
Communes of the Calvados department

References

Former communes of Calvados (department)
Calvados communes articles needing translation from French Wikipedia
Populated places disestablished in 2017